Naiara Telletxea Lopez (born 18 April 1984) is a road cyclist from Spain. She represented her nation at the 2006 UCI Road World Championships.

References

External links
 profile at Procyclingstats.com

1984 births
Spanish female cyclists
Living people
Place of birth missing (living people)